Adam Mickiewicz Museum may refer to:

 Adam Mickiewicz Museum, Istanbul
 Adam Mickiewicz Museum, Paris
 Adam Mickiewicz Museum of Literature, Warsaw